Theodore E. Shipkey (September 28, 1904 – July 18, 1978) was an American football player, coach of football and basketball, and college athletics administrator. Playing football at Stanford University from 1924 to 1926, he was a two-time All-American selection. Shipkey served as head football coach at Arizona State Teachers College at Tempe, now Arizona State University (1930–1932), the University of New Mexico (1937–1941), and the University of Montana (1949–1951), compiling a career college football coaching record of 55–43–4. He was also the head basketball coach at Arizona State from 1930 to 1933, tallying a mark of 32–30.

Playing career
Shipkey played end for Stanford under Pop Warner, and was an All-American in 1925 and 1926. He played in two Rose Bowls, and scored Stanford's only touchdowns in both the 1925 Rose Bowl, which Stanford lost to Notre Dame, 27–10, and the 1927 Rose Bowl, which ended in a 7–7 tie with Alabama.

Coaching career
From 1930 to 1932, he coached at Arizona State, and compiled a 13–10–2 record. From 1937 to 1941 he coached at New Mexico, where he compiled a 30–17–2 record. From 1949 to 1951, he coached at Montana, where he compiled a 12–16 record.

Death
Shipkey died on July 18, 1978, in Placentia, California, after suffering from Parkinson's disease.

Head coaching record

Football

References

1904 births
1978 deaths
American men's basketball coaches
American football ends
Arizona State Sun Devils athletic directors
Arizona State Sun Devils football coaches
Arizona State Sun Devils men's basketball coaches
Montana Grizzlies football coaches
New Mexico Lobos football coaches
Stanford Cardinal football players
Junior college football coaches in the United States
Deaths from Parkinson's disease